Fajãzinha is a settlement in the northern part of the island of Fogo, Cape Verde. It is situated on the coast, 3 km northwest of Mosteiros and 23 km northeast of the island capital São Filipe. Each year on May 13, the festival of Our Lady of Fatima (Nossa Senhora de Fátima) is celebrated in the settlement.

See also
List of villages and settlements in Cape Verde

References

Villages and settlements in Fogo, Cape Verde
Mosteiros, Cape Verde